Red Rose is a 2014 internationally co-produced drama film directed by Sepideh Farsi. It was screened in the Contemporary World Cinema section at the 2014 Toronto International Film Festival.

Cast
 Mina Kavani
 Vassilis Koukalani
 Shabnam Tolouei
 Rezvan Zandieh
 Babak Farahani
 Shirin Manian
 Hassan Malekian Ardestani

References

External links
 

2014 films
2014 drama films
French drama films
Iranian drama films
2010s Persian-language films
2010s French films